The 1884 Olivet football team was an American football team that represented Olivet College as an independent during the 1884 college football season. In Olivet's first year fielding a Varsity football team, the Comets compiled a 0–2 record, both games against , and were outscored by a total of 20 to 7.

Schedule

References

Olivet
Olivet Comets football seasons
College football winless seasons
Olivet football